Wesley Wagner Lanhupuy (1 November 1952 – 26 October 1995) was an Australian politician. He was the Labor member for Arnhem in the Northern Territory Legislative Assembly from 1983 until his resignation in 1995.
He died shortly after the by-election that was triggered by his resignation.

|}

Lanhupuy was the director of the Northern Land Council prior to entering politics. In 1983, Labor leader and Arnhem MLA Bob Collins nominated in the new seat of Arafura, allowing Lanhupuy to contest Arnhem at that year's election. He was narrowly defeated for preselection on the local ballot amidst a party factional conflict, but subsequently selected as the Labor candidate after the unanimous intervention of the federal executive of the Labor Party.

Schooling
Mr. Laynupuy attended Milingimbi School and Kormilda College in Darwin. He was a champion sportsman, captain of Pumarali (Lightning) House at Kormilda, sportsman of the year in 1971 when he was Darwin High School and Interschool High Jump Champion. At Kormilda Wesley was also assistant Scout master, a member of the C Men’s Basketball and A and B Grade Australian Rules teams.

Family
Mr. Laynupuy met his wife Ms. S.D. Gurruwiwi at Kormilda. She worked with him in parliament and was a translator and writer for him. They had three children together Gabby, Lisa and Wesley.

Mr. Laynhupuy’s oldest son Gary Dhurrkay (4 March 1974 – 21 August 2005) was an outstanding Australian Rules football player playing for East Fremantle, Fremantle and North Melbourne and a community leader. He played in the 1994 and 1998 East Fremantle Premiership sides and 21 games for North Melbourne in the 1999 and 2000 seasons.

References

1952 births
1995 deaths
Members of the Northern Territory Legislative Assembly
Australian Labor Party members of the Northern Territory Legislative Assembly
Indigenous Australian politicians
20th-century Australian politicians